Ustig is a 6th-century Pre-Congregational Saint of Wales.

He was a child of King Caw of Strathclyde and, according to Frederick Holweck, the brother of Aldate, bishop of Gloucester.

He is often associated with saints Dyfrig and Eldad.

References

Welsh Roman Catholic saints
6th-century Christian saints